Iriona is a municipality in the Honduran department of Colón.

Municipalities of the Colón Department (Honduras)